Sergeant Henri Le Fevre Brown (May 30, 1842 to April 29, 1910) was an American soldier who fought in the American Civil War. Brown received the country's highest award for bravery during combat, the Medal of Honor, for his action during the Battle of the Wilderness in Virginia on 6 May 1864. He was honored with the award on 23 June 1896.

Biography
Brown was born  in Jamestown, New York on 30 May 1842 and enlisted into the Company G, 72nd New York Volunteer Infantry at Ellicott, New York on 23 July 1861. He served in this company until 23 June 1864 when he was transferred to the 120th New York Infantry. It was while still enlisted in the 72nd Volunteer Infantry that Brown would perform the act of gallantry that earned him the Medal of Honor. He mustered out of the army on 3 June 1865, at the conclusion of the war.

In 1902 Brown published a book, The History of the Third Regiment, Excelsior Brigade, 72nd New York Volunteer Infantry. He died on 29 April 1910 and his remains are interred at the Lake View Cemetery in New York.

Medal of Honor citation

See also

List of American Civil War Medal of Honor recipients: A–F

References

1842 births
1910 deaths
People of New York (state) in the American Civil War
Union Army officers
United States Army Medal of Honor recipients
American Civil War recipients of the Medal of Honor